Vincent "Vinnie" Viola (born 1956) is an American billionaire businessman and U.S. Army veteran. He was for several weeks President Donald Trump's nominee for United States Secretary of the Army, before withdrawing from consideration. He is the former chairman of the New York Mercantile Exchange (NYMEX), and the founder and chairman of Virtu Financial. Viola is the owner of the Florida Panthers, a National Hockey League (NHL) ice hockey team. He is also the owner of St. Elias Stables and co-owner, with fellow Brooklynite Anthony Bonomo, of the 2017 Kentucky Derby winner Always Dreaming.

Early life, education and military service
Viola was born in 1956 to an Italian American family in the Williamsburg neighborhood of Brooklyn, New York, the son of Virginia (Torre) and John A. Viola. His father, an immigrant from Italy, worked as a truck driver after serving in the U.S. Army in the European theater of WWII. His father's Army service made a significant impression on Viola as a youth. Upon graduating from Brooklyn Technical High School, Viola attended the United States Military Academy.  At West Point, Viola played on the sprint football team and was cadet company commander for Company E-4 his senior year.

Viola graduated with a bachelor's degree from the United States Military Academy in 1977 and was commissioned as a second lieutenant in the U.S. Army. After graduating from the Infantry Officer Basic Course and Ranger School, he served with the 101st Airborne Division at Fort Campbell for several years. He received his juris doctor degree from New York Law School in June 1983, but did not complete the bar exam.

Career
Viola began his business career as a trader in the New York Mercantile Exchange (NYMEX) in 1982, raising $10,000 to purchase a seat on the exchange. He helped build the NYMEX while he served on the board of directors, as chairman of the Technology Committee, the Natural Gas Advisory Committee and the Facilities Committee, co-chairman of the Options Committee, vice chairman of NYMEX from 1993 to 1996, and chairman from March 2001 to March 2004. Prior to and following the Gulf War, Viola earned millions of dollars betting on oil prices.

Viola has launched a number of businesses during his career. In 1987, he founded Pioneer Futures, one of the top fifty futures commission merchants in the US. In 1988, he founded The Independent Bank Group, a Texas-based regional bank which is listed on NASDAQ (IBTX). Viola was also one of the two partners who launched EWT, LLC and Madison Tyler, LLC, two electric trading firms formerly based in Beverly Hills, CA and was able to use the electronic trading technique to his own personal gain making him one of the richest men in the world. In 2008, Viola founded Virtu Financial, active in electronic market making.  Viola took Virtu Financial public in April 2015, trading as a NASDAQ listed company (VIRT).

Leah McGrath Goodman's 2011 book, The Asylum: The Renegades Who Hijacked the World's Oil Market, describes Viola and his temperament. Goodman wrote Viola "had a nasty temper, but [predecessor chairman Lou] Guttman says he didn’t lose control of his emotions easily" and that "beneath the spit and polish he was still a tough guy from Brooklyn." In the book, Lou Guttman, the previous chairman at the New York Mercantile Exchange, said Viola "exuded leadership. His personality was amazing. He drew people in. He was a phenomenal speaker. Even if he didn’t know what he was talking about, he sounded like he knew what he was saying. He was an astute businessman and an extreme opportunist."

As of December 2016, Viola had a net worth of $1.78 billion.

Nomination for Secretary of the Army 
On December 19, 2016, then-President-elect Donald Trump announced his intention to nominate Viola for the position of Secretary of the Army. The choice was reported to be concerning to the nominated Secretary of Defense General James Mattis, who was reportedly not informed of the choice prior to the announcement, a position he would directly oversee, and was concerned about potential trading practices which were not yet fully investigated.

Viola withdrew himself from consideration for the position on February 3, 2017, citing his inability to comply with Pentagon regulations regarding personal businesses. Military Times reported that Viola had been searching for ways to divest from his business ventures, including transferring ownership of the Florida Panthers to his family members and transferring responsibility for operations to Vice Chairman Douglas Cifu.

Philanthropy
After the 9/11 attacks, Viola helped found the Combating Terrorism Center at West Point, and was the principal funder at its creation. Viola founded a technology company, Rowan Technology Solutions, to support cadet education in the areas of military history, military science, and leadership. Viola has endowed the Avery Cardinal Dulles, S.J. Chair in Catholic Theology at Fordham University.

Personal life
Viola and his wife Teresa have three adult sons and live in New York City. In 2013, their Upper East Side townhouse was listed for sale at $114 million. In January 2021, they sold their townhouse in the Brooklyn Heights Historical District for $25.5 million, setting a borough record.

Viola and Teresa are both involved in horseracing as the owners of St. Elias Stable and Teresa Viola Racing, respectively. They are co-owners of Kentucky Derby winner Always Dreaming.

References

External links

1956 births
American billionaires
American people of Italian descent
Florida Panthers owners
Living people
United States Army officers
National Hockey League owners
New York Law School alumni
People from Williamsburg, Brooklyn
People from the Upper East Side
United States Military Academy alumni